Michael Cowan (1948 – 10 May 2010) was an Irish hurler who played as a left wing-forward for the Tipperary senior team.

Regarded as one of Tipperary's most versatile players ever, Cowan joined the team during the 1969 championship and was a regular member of the starting fifteen until his retirement after the 1977 championship. His career coincided with a sharp downturn in the fortunes of the team, and he ended his playing days without any success.

At club level Cowan was a one-time All-Ireland medalist with Borris–Ileigh, after beginning his career with Moyne–Templetuohy. In addition to this he has also won four county club championship medals.

References

1948 births
2010 deaths
Moyne-Templetuohy hurlers
Borris-Ileigh hurlers
Tipperary inter-county hurlers